I Won't Get Bullied by Girls  is a Chinese romantic comedy teen TV series produced by Youku. The show was officially aired and streamed online on April 12, 2018 on Youku.

Synopsis
During his youth, Ye Lin (Cai Xukun) was bullied by Ren Xiaoqin (Hanna Lu). Determined to not be bullied by any girl, Ye Lin worked very hard and grew into a fine young man. A few years later, Xiaoqin transferred to the same school as Ye Lin after she realized that she had a crush on him. However, Ye Lin is still terrified by what Ren Xiaoqin did in the past, resulting in him becoming a cold-hearted and indifferent man to Ren Xiaoqin, who tried to win his heart. However, Shusha (Jiang Yu Wei) and Amy (Wang Xuan) also like Ye Lin, and are Xiaoqin's rivals for Ye Lin's love.

Who will end up with Ye Lin in the end?

Cast

References

External links
Official web site

Chinese romantic comedy television series
2018 Chinese television series debuts
Chinese web series
Youku original programming
2018 Chinese television series endings
2018 web series debuts